This is a record of ambassadors of the United States to Liberia.

Liberia, as a nation, had its beginnings in 1821 when groups of free blacks from the United States emigrated from the U.S. and began establishing colonies on the coast under the direction of the American Colonization Society. Between 1821 and 1847, by a combination of purchase and conquest, American Societies developed the colonies under the name "Liberia", dominating the native inhabitants of the area. In 1847 the colony declared itself an independent nation. Because it was already established as a nation, Liberia avoided becoming a European colony during the great age of European colonies in Africa during the latter half of the 19th century.

The United States recognized Liberia as an independent state in 1862 and commissioned its first representative to Liberia in 1863. The representative, Abraham Hanson, was appointed as commissioner/consul general. The status of the commissioner was later upgraded to Minister, and finally to full ambassador in 1949. Relations between the United States and Liberia have been continuous since that time.

Eight US ambassadors have died at their post serving in Liberia.

The US embassy in Liberia is located in Monrovia.

Ambassadors

Notes

See also
Liberia – United States relations
Foreign relations of Liberia
Ambassadors of the United States

References
United States Department of State: Background notes on Liberia

External links
 United States Department of State: Chiefs of Mission for Liberia
 United States Department of State: Liberia
 United States Embassy in Monrovia

Liberia

1863 establishments in the United States
United States